Captive supply is a term for that part of the supply that is not owned by a company but is used by the company to maximize its own profits often at the unknowing expense of those who actually own those supplies. This is usually a characteristic of a market that is dominated by one firm or a few firms and implicit collusion between those firms.  Often captive supply is called a beneficial market agreement by those controlling the supply but the actions of those controlling that supply reveal otherwise.  Captive supply is used to subvert the natural forces of market price determination to accrue more economic benefits to those who control it.  It circumvents the typically price-moderating market force of supply and demand by artificially restricting the supply. Example: American Bar Association Over Legal Industry.

Business terms